Islamia Colony is a neighborhood in the Karachi West district of Karachi, Pakistan. It was previously administered as part of the SITE Town borough, which was disbanded in 2011.

There are several ethnic groups in Islamia Colony including Muhajirs, Punjabis, Sindhis, Malik, Awan, Niazi, Mianwali, Kashmiris, Seraikis, Pakhtuns, Balochis, Memons, Bohras, Ismailis, etc.

Main areas 
 Nusrat Bhutto Colony
 Ismaeel Malang Road 
 New Mianwali Colony
 Kuari Colony

References

External links 
 Karachi Website .
 Local Government Sindh.

Neighbourhoods of Karachi
SITE Town